Mohammed Abdul Basit (born 10 December 1996) is a Ghanaian professional footballer who currently plays as an attacking midfielder for Al-Sinaa SC. A versatile offensive player, Abdul Basit can also play as second striker.

Career
Abdul Basit has played for several Ghanaian teams as a midfielder.

In May 2016, he joined Lithuanian A Lyga side Stumbras and became one of his club leaders, being elected in A Lyga Team of the Week 5 times.
On 31 January 2017 Basit joined Marítimo on loan.

After just half a season in Lebanon, Basit left Tadamon Sour in December 2019 due to uprise (crisis) in Lebanon.

In 2022, Basit moved to Vietnam to join V.League 1 team Song Lam Nghe An.

International career
Basit featured for Ghana Local Black Stars team at the 2011 African Nations Championship (CHAN) in Sudan. Ghana lost 0–1 to Niger in their final Group B match in Wad Madany, Sudan.

In November 2013, coach Maxwell Konadu invited him to be a part of the Ghana squad for the 2013 WAFU Nations Cup. He helped the team to a first-place finish after Ghana beat Senegal by three goals to one.

References

External links

Ghanaian footballers
Living people
Berekum Chelsea F.C. players
Al-Muharraq SC players
FC Stumbras players
C.S. Marítimo players
Ghana Premier League players
A Lyga players
Ghanaian expatriate footballers
Expatriate footballers in Lithuania
Ghanaian expatriate sportspeople in Lithuania
Expatriate footballers in Portugal
Ghanaian expatriate sportspeople in Portugal
Expatriate footballers in Lebanon
Ghanaian expatriate sportspeople in Lebanon
Lebanese Premier League players
Tadamon Sour SC players
1996 births
Association football midfielders
Association football forwards
Ghanaian expatriate sportspeople in Kuwait
Expatriate footballers in Kuwait
Ghanaian expatriate sportspeople in Libya
Expatriate footballers in Libya
Expatriate footballers in Vietnam
Ghanaian expatriate sportspeople in Vietnam
2011 African Nations Championship players
Ghana A' international footballers